Lesley Higgs (née Shipp; born 25 October 1965) is an English former international women's football goalkeeper. She appeared for England in the 1995 FIFA Women's World Cup Finals.

Club career
While playing for Arsenal, Higgs was Player of the Match in the 1993 WFA Cup Final.

In 1995, Higgs was playing for Wembley Ladies. She left Wembley to rejoin Arsenal in the 1997 close season.

International career
Higgs went to the 1995 World Cup as deputy to regular England keeper Pauline Cope. With quarter-final qualification ensured after winning the first two group games, Higgs played in the final group game, a 3–2 win against Nigeria.

References

1965 births
Living people
English women's footballers
England women's international footballers
FA Women's National League players
Watford F.C. Women players
Arsenal W.F.C. players
Millwall Lionesses L.F.C. players
1995 FIFA Women's World Cup players
Barnet F.C. Ladies players
Women's association football goalkeepers